

Events

January 
 January 25: French comic artist Riad Sattouf wins the Grand Prix de la ville d'Angoulême.
 January 30: It is announced that the Marc Sleen Museum in Brussels will close down in the fall, with part of the collection being integrated into the Belgian Comic Strip Center.

February
 February 20: French comic artist Jean-Michel Arroyo is sentenced to four years and 30 months of jail time for domestic violence, sexual violence and death threats against two of his former partners.
 February 21: The artwork for Zarya of the Dawn, a comic book written by Kris Kashtanova and illustrated with the artificial intelligence software Midjourney, gets its copyright protection revoked by the United States Copyright Office.
 February 25: Dutch comic artist Hans van Oudenaarden receives the annual Stripschapprijs for his work. The P. Hans Frankfurtherprijs for Special Accomplishments is given to Marc De Lobie, from publishing company Syndikaat.
 February 26: After making comments that are widely described as racist, comic artist Scott Adams is dropped by his syndicate. Several newspapers all discontinue his signature comic Dilbert. Portfolio, his book publisher, states it will drop his non-Dilbert book scheduled for release in September. Adams announces that Dilbert will be available through the subscription service Locals.

October
 October 10: It is announced that on this date, Bill Watterson and caricaturist John Kascht will release a graphic novel, The Mysteries. For Watterson, it is his first major release of a comic book in decades.

Deaths

January 
 January 5: Jack Bender, American comics artist (assisted on The Nutheads, continued Alley Oop), dies at age 91.
 January 7: Toni Batllori, Spanish comic artist (Ninots), dies at age 71 or 72.
 January 15: Lee Moder, American comic artist (co-creator of Stargirl), dies at age 53.
 January 19: David Sutherland, British comic artist (Billy the Cat and Katie, Totally Gross Germs, continued The Bash Street Kids, Dennis the Menace and  Gnasher, Biffo the Bear, Korky the Cat, Fred's Bed), dies at age 89.
 January 30: Al Schweitzer, American illustrator, comic artist and cartoonist (continued Weatherbird), dies at age 101.

February
 February 3: Albin Rogelj, Slovenian ski jumper, caricaturist and cartoonist (Smrkavec iz Levega Kota, Smrklja Iz Desnega Kota, Iva, Urška), dies at age 93.
 February 5: Chris Browne, American comic artist (Chris Browne's Comic Strip, Raising Duncan, assisted on and continued Hägar the Horrible), dies at age 70.
 February 7: Jo-El Azara, Belgian comic artist (Taka Takata, continued Clifton), dies at age 85.
 February 12: Enrich, French-Spanish comic artist (El Caco Bonifacio, El Pirata Malapata, El Doctor Perejil, continued El Repórter Tribulete), dies at age 93.
 February 13: Leiji Matsumoto, Japanese animator and manga artist (Galaxy Express 999, Space Pirate Captain Harlock, Queen Emeraldas, Queen Millennia), dies at age 85.
 February 27: Thierry Cailleteau, French comic writer (Aquablue, continued Wayne Shelton), dies at age 63.

March
 March 1: Wally Fawkes, A.K.A. Trog, British jazz musician and comic artist (Flook), dies at age 98. 
 March 11: Bill Tidy, British cartoonist and comic artist (The Fosdyke Saga, The Cloggies, Kegbuster, Dr. Whittle, Grimbledon Down), dies at age 89. 
 March 14: Luigi Piccatto, Italian comic artist (worked on Dylan Dog), dies at age 68. 
 March 17: Raoul Servais, Belgian animator, animated film director and comic artist (Pol en Piet), dies at age 94.

Exhibitions and shows

Notes